USS Aggressive (MSO-422) (originally designated AM-422) was an . She is the only ship of the United States Navy to be named Aggressive. This was later regarded as a mistake by President John F. Kennedy who stated that the ships should only be employed for "Peace keeping".

She was built by Luders Marine Construction Co. of Stamford, Connecticut, sponsored by Mrs. Stephen M. Archer, and commissioned at Brooklyn, New York, in the New York Naval Shipyard.

Service history
For most of 1954, Aggressive remained in the shipyard for alteration. In February 1955, her designation was changed to MSO-422. Her first deployment, immediately afterwards, had her take part in a mine warfare exercise off the south-east coast of the United States. She took part in the landing of American forces during the Lebanon crisis of 1958.

The ship was home ported at Charleston for her whole naval career. She also provided services to the Naval Mine Warfare School, Charleston; Naval Mine Defense Laboratory, Panama City, Florida; Mine Evaluation Detachment, Key West, Florida; and the Naval Ordnance Laboratory Test Facility, Fort Lauderdale, Florida. Aggressive also took part in several fleet exercises and operations along the Atlantic coast and in the Caribbean.

On 1 October 1970, preparations to deactivate the ship were begun, and she was decommissioned on 2 July 1971. Her name was struck from the Navy list on 28 February 1975, and she was sold to R. E. Williams in May 1980.

References

External links

hazegray.org: USS Aggressive (AM/MSO-422)

Agile-class minesweepers
Ships built in Stamford, Connecticut
1952 ships